Lawrence Cowan (born July 11, 1960) is an American former football running back who played in the National Football League for the Miami Dolphins and New England Patriots in 1982 for a total of 8 games.

References

1960 births
Living people
New England Patriots players
Miami Dolphins players
American football running backs
Jackson State Tigers football players
St. Louis Cardinals (football) players
National Football League replacement players